New Mexico State Road 404 (NM 404) is a  paved, two-lane state-maintained road in Doña Ana County in the U.S. State of New Mexico, that runs east–west across a gap between the northern edge of the Franklin Mountains and the southern edge of the North Franklin Mountains. The gap is known as the Anthony Gap due to its proximity to the community of Anthony, New Mexico.

The east terminus of NM 404 is its intersection with NM 213 just west of Chaparral, New Mexico.  The west terminus is in Anthony, New Mexico where it intersects with NM 460. It intersects Interstate 10.

Route description

The highway begins in Anthony at the intersection with NM 460. It continues East and after approximately  crosses Interstate 10. NM 404 then continues southeast for 3.62 miles at which point it enters Anthony Gap, between the Franklin Mountains and North Franklin Mountains ridges. Passing through the gap, NM 404 turns northeast and goes on for  until its end at NM 213.

History
NM 404 was created in June 1952 by the New Mexico State Highway Commission as Anthony Gap Road. In December 1962, the State Highway Commission passed a resolution changing the road's name to Charles O'Hara Road, after a local prominent businessman from the Anthony area, owner of a large amount of property and also a large local dairy.

The original alignment is between NM 460 and NM 213. During the 1970s, the western terminus shifted westward to NM 478. In the 1980s, the western terminus moved further west to NM 28, but by the 2000s, the western terminus was at its original alignment. The former NM 404 highway between NM 28 and the Rio Grande is now NM 186.

Major intersections

See also

References

External links

404
Transportation in Doña Ana County, New Mexico